Hon. Abdullahi Idris Garba is a Nigerian politician.  He is a member of the Federal House of Representatives (Nigeria), representing Kontagora/Wushishi/Mariga/Mashegu Federal Constituency.

Early life and education 
He was born on September 6, 1975. He is an indigene of Niger State from Kontagora Local Government Area.

He had his primary education in Baptist Primary School. He then preceded to Government Secondary School where he had his secondary education. For his tertiary education, he studied at Ahmadu Bello University Zaria and later went to University of Abuja.

Prior to becoming a member of the House of Representatives, he was a Veterinary Officer from 1992 to 2006.

Political career
Abdullahi Idris Garba's political career began when he was elected into the House of Representatives from 2007 to 2011 and later received another tenure in 2011 to 2015.

In the 2015 elections, he again re-contested for the Federal House of Representative under the platform of the All Progressive Congress (APC).

So far, Abdulahi Idris Garba is among the oldest serving member at the Federal House of Representative.

Legislative Interest(s):

Education, Transportation and Works

House Committee Membership and Chairmanship

Federal Representative at House of Representatives from May 2011 to May 2019

Vice-Chairman at Agricultural Colleges and Institutions Committee (Reps) from June 2015 to May 2019

Chairman at Population Committee (Reps) until May 2015

Committee Member at Aviation Committee (Reps) until May 2015

Committee Member at Marine Safety, Education & Administration Committee (Reps) until May 2015.

Chairman at Federal Capital Territory (Reps) from July 2019 till date

References

 

1975 births
Living people
Nigerian politicians
Nigerian veterinarians